"Space Race" is a song by New Zealand group Mi-Sex, released in June 1980 as the second single from their second studio album, Space Race (1980). The song peaked at number 19 in New Zealand and 28 in Australia.

Track listings
Australia/New Zealand 7" (BA 222672)
 "Space Race" - 3:44	
 "Living in September" - 2:41

Charts

References

Mi-Sex songs
1980 singles
1980 songs
CBS Records singles